The lingual branch of the glossopharyngeal nerve innervates the taste buds of the posterior 1/3 of the tongue and provides general sensation to this same area. The neuron cell bodies whose axons form the nerve, are found in the inferior ganglion of the glossopharyngeal nerve.

References 

Glossopharyngeal nerve
Gustatory system
Innervation of the tongue